Adzap is a town in northern Gabon near the border with Equatorial Guinea. It lies near Bitam.

References

Populated places in Woleu-Ntem Province